The Los Blanquitos Formation is a geological formation in Salta Province, Argentina whose strata date back to the Campanian age of the Late Cretaceous Period. Dinosaur remains are among the fossils that have been recovered from the formation. The formation consists of friable, micaceous, grayish-red sandstones with quartz pebbles containing small carbonate veins. In the base of this layer the remains of a titanosaurid dinosaur were discovered. Above the layer with bones appears a lens of thick, greenish-gray, calcareous, very hard sandstone with pebbles and gravel. The bones were covered by a "halo" of the same rock but of greenish or grayish color, especially visible because the normal sediment is red.

Vertebrate paleofauna 
 Guemesia ochoai - an abelisaurid theropod dinosaur, known from a nearly complete braincase
 Unquillosaurus ceiballi - a theropod dinosaur (possibly carcharodontosaurian or Maniraptoran), known from a pubis
 ?Titanosaurus sp. - a sauropod dinosaur

See also 
 List of dinosaur-bearing rock formations

References

Further reading 
 J.F. Bonaparte and G. Bossi. 1967. Sobre la presencia de dinosaurios en la Formación Pirgua del Grupo Salta y su significado cronologico [On the presence of dinosaurs in the Pirgua Formation of the Salta Group and its chronologic significance]. Acta Geologica Lilloana 9:25-44
 Powell, J.E. 2003. Revision of South American titanosaurid dinosaurs: palaeobiological, palaeobiogeographical and phylogenetic aspects. Records of the Queen Victoria Museum Launceston 111:1-173
 Powell, J.E. 1979. Sobre una asociacion de dinosaurios y otras evidencias de vertebrados del Cretacico superior de la region de La Candelaria, Prov. de Salta, Argentina. Ameghiniana 16: pp. 191–204

Geologic formations of Argentina
Upper Cretaceous Series of South America
Cretaceous Argentina
Campanian Stage
Sandstone formations
Fluvial deposits
Formations
Fossiliferous stratigraphic units of South America
Paleontology in Argentina
Geology of Salta Province